Baek Soo-hee is a South Korean actress. She is known for her roles in dramas such as Be Melodramatic, Soul Mechanic, Mystic Pop-up Bar and Was It Love?.

Filmography

Television series

Web series

Film

Music video appearances

References

External links 
 
 

1992 births
Living people
21st-century South Korean actresses
South Korean television actresses
South Korean film actresses